First Lady is the unofficial title used in some countries for the spouse of an elected head of state; it is also used in non-political contexts for prominent women in particular fields.

First Lady may also refer to:

Theatre, film and TV
First Lady (play), a 1935 play by George S. Kaufman and Katharine Dayton
First Lady (film), a 1937 adaptation of the play
The First Lady (British TV series), a 1960s drama series
The First Lady (Colombian TV series), a Colombian telenovela
The First Lady (film), a 2015 Nigerian film
First Lady (Philippine TV series), a 2022 Philippine drama series
The First Lady (American TV series), a 2022 US anthology series
First Lady (South Korean TV series), an upcoming South Korean television series

Music
First Lady (album), by Lisa Maffia, 2003
The First Lady (Tammy Wynette album), 1970
The First Lady (Faith Evans album), 2005
 "The First Lady", a song by Irving Berlin

Yachts
 Blackmores First Lady sailed by Kay Cottee on her solo circumnavigation

See also

Lady (disambiguation)
First (disambiguation)
Ladies First (disambiguation)
First woman (disambiguation)